Margaretha Knutsdotter Krook (15 October 1925 – 7 May 2001) was a Swedish stage and film actress. She won the Eugene O'Neill Award in 1974. In 1976, she won the Guldbagge Award for Best Actress for the film Release the Prisoners to Spring. She was awarded the Illis quorum in 1995.

Selected filmography

1949: Only a Mother – Berta
1951: Miss Julie – Governess
1953: Barabbas – Woman in Robbers' Cave (uncredited)
1954: Storm Over Tjurö – Augusta
1954: Karin Månsdotter – Karin's Sister (uncredited)
1954: Salka Valka – Sigurlina Jonsdottir
1958: Brink of Life – Dr. Larsson (uncredited)
1961: Swedenhielms (TV Movie) – Marta Boman
1961: Lita på mej älskling – Mrs. Nilsson
1963: Adam och Eva – Ms. Nyfröjd
1964: Swedish Wedding Night – Mary
1964: Svenska bilder – Mrs. Kronback
1966: JAG – Bus Driver
1966: Träfracken – Nurse Ann Wahlman
1966: Persona – The Doctor
1966: Adamsson i Sverige – Astrid Samuelsson
1968: Bombi Bitt och jag (TV Series) – Franskan
1969: Bokhandlaren som slutade bada – Amelie Arbel
1970: Ministern – The Mother
1970: Den magiska cirkeln – Ingvar's Mother
1972: The Man Who Quit Smoking – Prostitute
1973: Bröllopet – Sofia Långsjö
1974: Vita nejlikan eller Den barmhärtige sybariten – Margit
1975: Monismanien 1995 – Prosecutor
1975: Release the Prisoners to Spring – Rådmans dotter
1976: Drömmen om Amerika – Mrs. Alm
1978: The Adventures of Picasso – Doña Maria
1978: A Walk in the Sun – Ellen
1980: Sverige åt svenskarna – Canteen Svea
1981: Sopor – Gösta Bohman
1981: Snacka går ju... – Gun
1982: Brusten himmel – Grandma
1984: Sköna juveler – Old Woman
1985: De flyvende djævle – Hildegarde Altenburg
1986: Morrhår och ärtor – Konsulinnan Ahlhagen
1989: Jönssonligan på Mallorca – Germann
1990: Den hemliga vännen – The wife
1992: The Best Intentions – Blenda Bergman
1997: Rika barn leka bäst – Bordellkonsulten
2000: Gossip – Ingrid Seth
2000: Dinosaur – Eema (voice)
2002: Karlsson på taket – Miss Hildur Bock (voice)

References

Further reading

External links

Actresses from Stockholm
1925 births
2001 deaths
Swedish stage actresses
Swedish film actresses
Eugene O'Neill Award winners
Litteris et Artibus recipients
Best Actress Guldbagge Award winners
Burials at Galärvarvskyrkogården
Recipients of the Illis quorum